Düzcespor is a Turkish football club located in Düzce, Turkey. They play their home games at 18 Temmuz Stadı in Düzce. The club colors are red-navy blue. Former Fenerbahce Chairman Aziz Yıldırım was a player of youth teams of Duzcespor.

League participations
TFF First League: 1968–1970, 1977–1989, 1994–1998, 1999–2001
TFF Second League: 1967–1968, 1970–1977, 1989–1994, 1998–1999, 2022-present
TFF Third League: 2001–2003, 2008–2010, 2015–2022
Turkish Regional Amateur League: 2010–2012, 2014–15
Düzce Amateur League: 2003–2008, 2012–14

Current squad

Other players under contract

Out on loan

External links
 Official website
 Düzcespor on TFF.org

Sport in Düzce
Football clubs in Turkey
Association football clubs established in 1967
1967 establishments in Turkey